Roman Vetulani (8 August 1849 – 12 August 1908) was a Polish high school professor, secretary of "Sokół" gymnastics organization chapter in Sanok, honorary member of Macierz Ziemi Cieszyńskiej since 1898.

Biography 
He was born in Bochnia in 1849 as the son of a father of Italian descent, Michał Vetulani, and a Polish mother, Franciszka Śliwińska. Roman Vetulani graduated in classical philology from Lvov University. He had six children: Kazimierz (professor of Lvov University), Zygmunt (diplomat), Tadeusz (professor of Adam Mickiewicz University in animal husbandry), Adam (historian of medieval law and canonist, professor of Jagiellonian University), Maria, and Elżbieta (died in childhood). Roman Vetulani died on 12 August 1908 in Zawoja, Poland. As his grandson Jerzy said, he died in consequence of heart disease.

Family tree

References 

1849 births
1908 deaths
Polish educators
People from Bochnia
Polish people of Italian descent
University of Lviv alumni